Eiling Kramer (July 14, 1914 – May 5, 1999) MLA, was an auctioneer, rancher and political figure in Saskatchewan, Canada.

Eiling Kramer was born in 1914, the son of Minne Dowe Kramer and Jacobina Kopinga, in Highworth, Saskatchewan in the North Battleford district. After attending school in Highworth, Eiling worked at a number of jobs, then purchased a ranch where he raised cattle. In 1944, he married Dorothy Johnston. He established an auctioneering business in 1949. In 1950, he helped form the Saskatchewan Farmers' Union and served two years as its vice-president.

He is remembered as one of the most charming and colourful characters to grace Saskatchewan's political scene.  Kramer was the longest-serving member in the history of Saskatchewan's Legislative Assembly.  First elected in 1952 as the member of the Legislative Assembly (MLA) for The Battlefords, Eiling won re-election in every campaign he contested. He served as a Cabinet minister in the New Democratic Party of Saskatchewan governments under Woodrow Lloyd and Allan Blakeney, managing portfolios that included the departments of Natural Resources, Co-operation and Co-operatives, and Highways and Transportation.  He was involved with the Saskatchewan Wheat Pool, the Sherwood Co-op Association and the Lions and Cosmopolitan Clubs.

Eiling retired from politics in 1980, moving to North Battleford and later Regina, where he died at the age of 84 in 1999.

References 

1914 births
1999 deaths
People from North Battleford
Saskatchewan Co-operative Commonwealth Federation MLAs
20th-century Canadian politicians
Saskatchewan New Democratic Party MLAs
Canadian auctioneers
Canadian ranchers
Members of the Executive Council of Saskatchewan